Jamil Gedeão (born 19 April 1931) is a Brazilian basketball player. He competed in the men's tournament at the 1956 Summer Olympics.

References

External links
 

1931 births
Living people
Brazilian men's basketball players
1954 FIBA World Championship players
Olympic basketball players of Brazil
Basketball players at the 1956 Summer Olympics
Sportspeople from Recife
20th-century Brazilian people